4-Fluorobutanol is a chemical compound, a flammable colorless liquid which is a fluorinated alcohol.  Like 2-fluoroethanol, it is highly toxic due to its ready metabolism to fluoroacetate.

See also
 1,3-Difluoro-2-propanol
 2-Fluoroethanol
 Methyl fluoroacetate
 Fluoroethyl fluoroacetate

References

Primary alcohols
Organofluorides